Natallia Viatkina (born 10 February 1987) is a Belarusian triple jumper. She represented her country at the 2016 Summer Olympics without qualifying for the final.

Achievements

References
 

1987 births
Living people
Belarusian female triple jumpers
Athletes (track and field) at the 2016 Summer Olympics
Olympic athletes of Belarus
Competitors at the 2011 Summer Universiade